List of heliports

References

Trabzon location not corrector

External links
Directorate General of Civil Aviation

Heliports
Turkey
Heliports